BK Liepāja is a professional basketball club in Liepāja, Latvia playing in the Latvian-Estonian Basketball League and Latvian Basketball League.

History 
Basketball team in the city of Liepāja was first founded in 1991, just after Latvia regained independence from Soviet Union. During the years team changed names, according to sponsorships. Previous team names were Liepājas Metalurgs, Baltika/Kaija, BK Liepāja, Līvu alus/Liepāja, Liepājas Lauvas, Liepāja/Triobet. 

The club was dissolved in 2018 and was replaced by Liepājas Basketbols. Team has a strong bond with the local basketball school. 

Liepāja team's greatest achievement in Latvian Basketball League is gained second place in 1997, but in 2000, 2011 and 2012 team won the third place. 

Since 2020, with the hiring of Latvian National team assistant and 2018 FIBA U18 European Championship silver medalist Artūrs Visockis-Rubenis as their head coach, BK Liepāja focuses on building teams around new talents. 

In 2021/2022 season BK Liepāja made their international debut, competing in newly founded European North Basketball League. Liepāja won one of five games and finished the tournament at 5th place.

Players

Current roster

Depth chart

Season by season

Notable players

 Edgars Jeromanovs
 Mareks Jurevičus
 Mārtiņš Meiers
 Mareks Mejeris
 Jānis Porziņģis
 Artūrs Štālbergs
 Jānis Timma
 Raimonds Vaikulis
 Uģis Viļums
 Paul Butorac
 Vernon Hamilton
 Josh Mayo
 Ashton Mitchell
 Malcolm Griffin
 Kris Richard
 Martynas Andriukaitis
 Valdas Dabkus
 Laimonas Kisielius

References

External links
Official website 

Sport in Liepāja
Basketball teams in Latvia
Basketball in Latvia
Basketball teams established in 1991
Basketball teams disestablished in 2018